American singer-songwriter Taylor Swift has received numerous awards, nominations, and honorary accolades throughout her career. She signed a record deal with Big Machine Records in 2005 and released her self-titled debut studio album in 2006. At the 50th Annual Grammy Awards, Swift earned a Best New Artist nomination. Her second studio album, Fearless (2008), spawned five singles, including the MTV Video Music Award for Best Female Video-winning "You Belong with Me". The album and its tracks were nominated for eight Grammy Awards and won four, including Album of the Year, making Swift the youngest recipient of the category at the time. The most awarded album in country music history, Fearless was the first to win the American Music Award, Country Music Association, Academy of Country Music Award, and Grammy Award for Album of the Year.

Swift was awarded the American Music Award for Artist of the Year in 2009. She was listed as one of 100 most influential people by Time magazine the following year, as well as in 2015 and 2019. Her third studio album Speak Now (2010) won Favorite Country Album at the American Music Awards of 2011, and its single "Mean" won two Grammy Awards. In late 2011, Swift contributed two original songs to The Hunger Games soundtrack album, including "Safe & Sound", which was awarded the Grammy Award for Best Song Written for Visual Media. Her next albums—Red (2012) 1989 (2014)—were nominated for a Grammy Award for Album of the Year; the latter won the award. In 2014, Swift won Billboard Woman of the Year for the second time, after first being honored in 2011. In 2015, the IFPI Global Recording Artist of the Year Award presented her the Global Recording Artist award, and she won eight Billboard Music Awards.

Swift's wins at the American Music Awards of 2018 included Artist of the Year and Favorite Pop/Rock Album for her sixth studio album Reputation, and Tour of the Year for Reputation Stadium Tour. At the 2019 ceremony, she became the first woman to be awarded Artist of the Decade. The following year, she won three of her four nominations, extending her record for most Artist of the Year wins (7). With 32 wins, and in 2022 she again extended her record with a total of 40 wins. She is the most awarded artist in AMAs history. Swift previously held the record for most Billboard Music Awards wins until Canadian rapper Drake surpassed her in 2019. She currently holds records for most Billboard Music Award wins for a female artist (29), most Teen Choice Awards wins (26) for a solo artist and most iHeartRadio Music Awards wins (14) for a solo artist. Swift has won fourteen MTV Video Music Awards, including Video of the Year for "Bad Blood", "You Need To Calm Down" and All Too Well: The Short Film, making her the most-awarded person in the category. At the 2016 BMI Pop Awards, Swift was honored with the Taylor Swift Award, becoming the second artist in BMI history after Michael Jackson to have an award named after its recipient.

Swift's singles "Me!" and "You Need to Calm Down" from her seventh studio album Lover received a record twelve nominations at the 2019 MTV Video Music Awards and won three. She received Billboard first-ever Woman of the Decade award at its Women in Music ceremony in December 2019. Her eighth studio album, Folklore, won Album of the Year at the 63rd Annual Grammy Awards, making Swift the first woman and fourth artist overall to win the prize thrice. She was awarded the BRIT Global Icon Award in 2021, her second BRIT win, for her impact on music worldwide. Her ninth studio album, Evermore, was nominated for Album of the Year at the 64th Annual Grammy Awards. She won three awards at the 2022 MTV Video Music Awards. Swift has also broken 92 Guinness World Records.

Awards and nominations

Other accolades

Guinness World Records 
As of 2022, Swift has broken 92 Guinness World Records, of which 16 times she broke her own record or regained it, and 73 remain unbroken.

Listicles

Honorary degree

Notes

References

Swift, Taylor
Awards and nominations